Canyon River may refer to:

Canyon River (Ontario) 
Canyon River (film), a 1956 film directed by Harmon Jones